Jarjara is a Syrian village located in the Hama Subdistrict of Hama District. According to the Syria Central Bureau of Statistics (CBS), Jarjara had a population of 772 in the 2004 census.

References 

Populated places in Hama District